Anner Bylsma (born Anne Bijlsma, 17 February 1934 – 25 July 2019) was a Dutch cellist who played on both modern and period instruments in a historically informed style. He took an interest in music from an early age. He studied with 
Carel van Leeuwen Boomkamp at the Royal Conservatory of The Hague and won the Prix d'excellence in 1957.

In 1959, he won the first prize in the Pablo Casals Competition in Mexico. Later he was for six years (from 1962 to 1968) the principal cellist of the Royal Concertgebouw Orchestra. He became an Erasmus Scholar at Harvard University in 1982. He was the author of the book Bach, the Fencing Master, a stylistic and aesthetic analysis of Bach's cello suites. He was one of the pioneers of the "Dutch Baroque School" and rose to fame as a partner of Frans Brüggen and Gustav Leonhardt, who toured extensively together and made many recordings. Bylsma continued to be a towering figure in the baroque cello movement.

In 1979, Bylsma recorded the six suites for unaccompanied cello (BWV 1007–1012) by J. S. Bach, the first of its kind on a period instrument. He later went on to recreate the same music in 1992 on the large Servais Stradivarius and on a five-string violoncello piccolo.

Bylsma was married to the Dutch violinist Vera Beths (mother of Dutch actress Katja Herbers). He had a son and a daughter, documentary filmmaker Carine Bijlsma.

References

External links

Interview with Anner Bylsma, April 18, 1989
 Anner Bylsma: Bach, the fencing master: Reading aloud from the first three cello suites. Basel: Bylsma Fencing Mail, 2nd ed., no date. . (Self-published)

1934 births
2019 deaths
Harvard University staff
Dutch classical cellists
Musicians from The Hague
Players of the Royal Concertgebouw Orchestra
Royal Conservatory of The Hague alumni
Dutch performers of early music
20th-century Dutch musicians
20th-century Dutch male musicians
21st-century Dutch musicians
21st-century male musicians
20th-century classical musicians